Haydn "Hud" Rickit (born 19 February 1951) is a former New Zealand rugby union player. A lock, Rickit represented Auckland and Waikato at a provincial level, and also played for Australian state side Queensland in 1974. He was a member of the New Zealand national side, the All Blacks, in 1981, playing two test matches against the touring Scotland team.

References

1951 births
Living people
New Zealand rugby union players
New Zealand international rugby union players
Auckland rugby union players
Queensland Reds players
Waikato rugby union players
Sportspeople from Taupō
Rugby union locks
Māori All Blacks players
People educated at Taupo-nui-a-Tia College
Hud
Rugby union players from Waikato